Robert Dodd McConnell, known as Bertie McConnell (born 1921) is a former Army officer and politician in Northern Ireland.

McConnell was born in Bangor, County Down, and served in the British Army in World War II.  During the war, he lost his sight.

In 1958, McConnell was elected to Bangor Borough Council, serving until 1973.  He was elected at the 1969 Northern Ireland general election, as an independent Unionist Member of Parliament for Bangor.  Despite being an independent, he was a supporter of Ulster Unionist Party Prime Minister Terence O'Neill.

McConnell joined the Alliance Party of Northern Ireland alongside Phelim O'Neill and Tom Gormley in early 1972.  He was elected to North Down Borough Council in 1973, and to the Northern Ireland Assembly for North Down.  He held this seat on the Northern Ireland Constitutional Convention in 1975, and served as the President of the Alliance Party in 1976.

McConnell stood down from his council seat in 1981 and took no further role in active politics.

References

1921 births
Possibly living people
Members of North Down Borough Council
Alliance Party of Northern Ireland members of the House of Commons of Northern Ireland
Members of the House of Commons of Northern Ireland 1969–1973
Members of the Northern Ireland Assembly 1973–1974
Members of the Northern Ireland Constitutional Convention
Independent members of the House of Commons of Northern Ireland
Blind politicians
Members of the House of Commons of Northern Ireland for County Down constituencies
Alliance Party of Northern Ireland councillors
British Army personnel of World War II